The Gambino Family was an American hip hop group  founded by Master P in 1997, named after the Gambino crime family. The four members of the group were Lil Gotti (after John Gotti), Malachi, Pheno and Reginelli (after Marco Reginelli).

Biography
The Gambino Family made their debut mainstream appearance in 1997 on the soundtrack to I'm Bout It on the song "Why They Wanna See Me Dead". After appearing on numerous No limit releases in 1998, including Steady Mobb'n's Black Mafia, Soulja Slim's Give It 2 'Em Raw and Fiend's There's One in Every Family, the group's debut album entitled Ghetto Organized was released on October 20, 1998. Though it found big success on the Billboard charts, peaking at #17 on the Billboard 200 and #3 on the Top R&B/Hip-Hop Albums. In 1999 Malachi and Reginelli formed the group Young Guns, appearing on Lil Soldiers' Boot Camp album and Master P's Only God Can Judge Me. They joined TRU Records in 2000, appearing together on C-Murder's Trapped In Crime, and on C-Murder's albums: Reginelli on www.cp-3.com, Malachi on Tru Dawgs and Screamin' 4 Vengeance.

Members
Lil Gotti (birth name Jonathan Miller)
Melchoir
Pheno (birth name Edward Jamal Bell Jr.)(deceased)
Reginelli

Discography

Albums

Singles

As lead artist

See also
 No Limit Records
 No Limit Records discography
 Beats by the Pound

References

American hip hop groups
Southern hip hop groups
No Limit Records artists
Gangsta rap groups